The following is a list of massacres that have occurred in North Korea (numbers may be approximate):

See also
Mass killings in North Korea
List of massacres in South Korea

References

North Korea
Massacres